Ezekiel Field Clay was a Confederate colonel during the American Civil War that served in several battles that took place in his home state of Kentucky.

Biography
Zeke was born on December 1, 1840 as the son of Brutus J. Clay who was a stock-breeder and would become president of the Kentucky Agricultural Association as well as member of the United States House of Representatives serving the 7th Kentucky District.

When the American Civil War broke out, Clay organized a company of mounted men from Bourbon County to head out for Prestonsburg where they enlisted in the 1st Kentucky Mounted Rifles and would go on to participate in the Battle of Ivy Mountain as his service during the battle would receive praise by John S. Williams.

In the years 1862 and 1863, Clay would go on to serve in the Army of Southwestern Virginia and attempted to capture Louisa in the Spring of 1863 but failed. After the failure of the raid, Clay and his men were commanded by Nathan Bedford Forrest at the Battle of Chickamauga. In Shelbyville however, Clay got wounded but was able to participate in the Knoxville campaign. He would later return to Kentucky to conduct the Battle of Salyersville but got wounded in the eye and captured by the Union forces and arrested in Johnson's Island where he remained until Robert E. Lee surrendered.

After the war, Clay returned to Bourbon County and became a horsebreeder where his farm became famous for being one of the most renowned thoroughbreds in Kentucky. He died on July 26, 1920, from declining health and passed away. He was then buried at the Paris Cemetery after his funeral.

References

1840 births
1920 deaths
Burials in Kentucky
Confederate States Army officers
People from Bourbon County, Kentucky
People of Kentucky in the American Civil War